Jeffrey Alan Schechter (usually credited as Jeff Schechter) is a screenwriter whose work has been nominated for two Emmy awards, a Writers Guild of America award, and a Writers Guild of Canada award. His writing credits include Strange Days at Blake Holsey High, Overruled!, the Disney Channel original film Brink!, Bloodsport II: The Next Kumite and Dennis the Menace Strikes Again. In 2015, he created the ABC Family science fiction crime drama Stitchers.

Early life and education

Schechter was born and raised in Brooklyn, New York, graduated from Edward R. Murrow High School and is a graduate from the film program at SUNY Purchase.

Filmography

Television
The numbers in directing and writing credits refer to the number of episodes.

References

External links
 

Screenwriters from New York (state)
Television producers from New York City
American television writers
American male television writers
People from Brooklyn
State University of New York at Purchase alumni
Living people
Year of birth missing (living people)
Edward R. Murrow High School alumni